The 13th FINA World Junior Synchronised Swimming Championships was held September 12–16, 2012 in Volos, Greece. The synchronised swimmers are aged between 15 and 18 years old, from 33 nations, swimming in four events: Solo, Duet, Team and Free combination.

Participating nations
33 nations swam at the 2012 World Junior Championships were:

Results

References

FINA World Junior Synchronised Swimming Championships
2012 in synchronized swimming
Sport in Volos
Events in Volos
Swimming
Jun
International aquatics competitions hosted by Greece
Synchronized swimming in Greece